The Maruti Suzuki Eeco (or previously known as Maruti Suzuki Versa) is a microvan introduced in India by the Indian automaker Maruti Suzuki in early 2010. This car is a stripped down version of the discontinued Versa which itself was the Indian version of the Suzuki Every Plus/Landy, which is the non-kei car version of 10th generation Carry van. It is a refresh in lines with Maruti Suzuki not being able to come up with a new minivan. EECO comes with 5-seater and 7-seater options. It is equipped with an advanced engine management system for optimizing fuel efficiency and performance. It is marketed by the manufacturer as a perfect car for every occasion—a business trip or a picnic with the loved ones.

It is also the entry-level replacement for the Omni, discontinued in 2019 after Suzuki was unable to redesign the Omni to meet India's safety standards.

Overview

Versa
Originally, the van was launched as Versa in 2001 and based on the Every Plus/Carry 1.3. The van was powered by the same 1298cc G13BB engine that also seen in the original model or the familiar Esteem. The engine puts out  and paired with a 5-speed manual transmission. It was offered in there trim levels; STD, DX and DX2.
The van was later discontinued in late 2009.

Eeco

Maruti Suzuki relaunched the Versa as Eeco in January 2010. The van was revised with downgrading some Versa's features and visual such as the dual blower air conditioning and colored bumpers, although the headlights were updated with more modern style. The G13BB engine was also downsized by reducing the displacement to 1196cc (G12B), the engine produced . The 5-speed gearbox was also carried over from Versa. Unlike the Versa, factory fitted CNG was available for this engine, marketed as Intelligent Gas Port Injection  (i-GPI) and later as S-CNG.

In March 2019, the Eeco received major safety features such as diver side airbag, ABS,seat belt reminder system, speed alert and reverse parking sensors as standard across the range. The safety features are also improved with engine immobiliser, illuminated hazard switch, dual airbags and child lock for the sliding doors.

Safety 
The Eeco for India with no airbags nor ABS received 0 stars for adult occupants and 2 stars for toddlers from Global NCAP in 2016 (similar to Latin NCAP 2013).

References

 

Eeco
Cars introduced in 2010
Microvans
2010s cars